is the last single of the J-pop idol group Morning Musume subgroup Morning Musume Otomegumi. In addition to the title song and its karaoke version, the single also contains Morning Musume Otomegumi versions of the earlier Morning Musume songs "Say Yeah!: Motto Miracle Night" and "Summer Night Town". "Say Yeah!: Motto Miracle Night" was originally featured on the Best! Morning Musume 1 album and "Summer Night Town" was originally featured on the "Summer Night Town" single. Morning Musume Sakuragumi also released another version of "Say Yeah!: Motto Miracle Night" at the same time on the "Sakura Mankai" single.

Track listing 
The lyricist and composer of the songs is Tsunku. Both "Yūjō ~Kokoro no Busu ni wa Naranee!~" and the Otomegumi version of "Summer Night Town" was arranged by Suzuki Shunsuke. On the other hand, the Otomegumi version of "Say Yeah! ~Motto Miracle Night~" was arranged by Konoshi Takao.

CD 
 
 
 
 "Yūjō (Kokoro no Busu ni wa Naranee!)" (Instrumental)

Single V DVD 
The DVD also features the two version of Morning Musume Sakuragumi's "Sakura Mankai" music videos.
2. "Yūjō (Kokoro no Busu ni wa Naranee!)"
4. "Yūjō (Kokoro no Busu ni wa Naranee!) (Oi! Oi! Version)"

Members at time of single 
 1st generation: Kaori Iida
 4th generation: Rika Ishikawa, Nozomi Tsuji
 5th generation: Makoto Ogawa
 6th generation: Miki Fujimoto, Sayumi Michishige, Reina Tanaka

Personnel 
 Tsunku – composer, background vocals
 Suzuki Shunsuke – arranger (tracks 1 and 3)
 Konoshi Takao – arranger (track 2)

Chart positions

Performances

Television 
 February 16, 2004 – Hey! Hey! Hey! Music Champ
 March 4, 2004 – Utaban

Concerts

References

External links 
 "Yūjō ~Kokoro no Busu ni wa Naranee!~" entry on the Hello! Project official website 
 Sakura Mankai/Yūjō ~Kokoro no Busu ni wa Naranee!~ DVD entry on the Hello! Project official website 

Morning Musume songs
2004 singles
Song recordings produced by Tsunku
Japanese-language songs
Songs written by Tsunku
2004 songs
Zetima Records singles
Dance-pop songs